One Touch may refer to:
One Touch (Eric Marienthal album), 1993
One Touch (Sugababes album), 2000
"One Touch" (Jess Glynne and Jax Jones song), 2019
"One Touch" (Kadiatou song), 2021
"One Touch" (Mini Viva song), 2010
"One Touch", a song by LCD Soundsystem from This Is Happening
"One Touch", a song by Steps from What the Future Holds
One-touch football, a tactic in association football
OneTouch Ultra, a blood glucose monitoring system